Larissa Harrison (born 5 January 1990 in Kaitaia, New Zealand) is a New Zealand netball player. Harrison has played with the New Zealand U21 netball team since 2008, and will compete at the 2009 World Youth Netball Championships in the Cook Islands. She also signed with the Central Pulse in the 2009 ANZ Championship season, playing as a goal shooter.

References

New Zealand netball players
Central Pulse players
1990 births
Living people
ANZ Championship players
People from Kaitaia